NCIS: New Orleans is an American television series that premiered on CBS on September 23, 2014. The series is set in New Orleans, Louisiana, and follows the stories of the members of the local office of the Naval Criminal Investigative Service (NCIS). The program and its characters were introduced in a two-part episode during the eleventh season of the television series NCIS on March 25 and April 1, 2014. NCIS: New Orleans was renewed for a sixth season on April 22, 2019, which premiered on September 24, 2019. On May 6, 2020, NCIS: New Orleans was renewed for the seventh season, which premiered on November 8, 2020. On February 17, 2021, it was announced that the seventh season will be the series' final season.

Series overview

Episodes

Introductory episodes 
The program and its characters are introduced during the eleventh season of NCIS. The NCIS episodes, "Crescent City (Part I)" and "Crescent City (Part II)", served as backdoor pilot episodes for the show. These episodes are included in the NCIS Season 11 DVD set. In the UK the two episodes were screened on Channel 5 as a feature-length premiere episode of NCIS: New Orleans.

Season 1 (2014–15)

Season 2 (2015–16)

Season 3 (2016–17)

Season 4 (2017–18)

Season 5 (2018–19)

Season 6 (2019–20)

Season 7 (2020–21)

Home media

References

External links 
 
 

NCIS: Orleans
NCIS: New Orleans
NCIS: New Orleans
NCIS: New Orleans